The Singapore Economic Review is a peer-reviewed academic journal published by World Scientific. The journal was established in 1956 as the Malayan Economic Review, obtaining its current name in 1969. It is  the official journal of the Economic Society of Singapore. The journal covers economics in general, with an emphasis on economic issues in Asia. According to the Journal Citation Reports, the journal has a 2020 impact factor of 1.315.

The journal is published by the Institute of Southeast Asian Studies (ISEAS). The SER covers a wide range of topics related to the economy, including macroeconomics, international trade, labor economics, and financial economics. The journal is published quarterly and is considered an important source of information and analysis on the Singaporean economy for researchers, policymakers, and other professionals.

Abstracting and indexing
The journal is abstracted and indexed in:

References

External links

Economic Society of Singapore

English-language journals
Publications established in 1956
Economics journals
World Scientific academic journals
5 times per year journals